Halgerda is a genus of sea slugs, dorid nudibranchs, shell-less marine gastropod mollusks in the family Discodorididae.

Taxonomy 
The genus Halgerda was classified within the family Halgerdidae by Odhner (1934).
Halgerdidae Odhner, 1926, is treated as a synonym of Discodorididae in the taxonomy of Bouchet & Rocroi (2005). See also Valdés (2002). 
Seven species of Halgerda were described in the years 1880-1905, two species in 1932-1949, four species from 1975-1982, then 22 species in the years 1993-2001. In 2018 another six new species were described from Mozambique, highlighting the number of undescribed species on the African coast of the Indian Ocean. A number of undescribed species are known and many species show considerable variation across their ranges, which may indicate that more cryptic species exist.

Distribution
All species of Halgerda are confined to the Indo-West Pacific Tropical region apart from two species which are found in warm temperate waters of South Africa and Southern Australia and one species from warm temperate Japanese waters.

Species
Species within the genus Halgerda include:

 Halgerda abyssicola Fahey & Gosliner, 2000
 Halgerda albocristata Fahey & Gosliner, 1999
 Halgerda aurantiomaculata (Allan, 1932)
 Halgerda azteca Fahey & Gosliner, 2000
 Halgerda bacalusia Fahey & Gosliner, 1999
 Halgerda batangas Carlson & Hoff, 2000
 Halgerda brunneomaculata Carlson & Hoff, 1993
 Halgerda brycei Fahey & Gosliner, 2001
 Halgerda carlsoni Rudman, 1978
 Halgerda dalanghita Fahey & Gosliner, 1999
 Halgerda diaphana Fahey & Gosliner, 1999
 Halgerda dichromis Fahey & Gosliner, 1999
 Halgerda elegans Bergh, 1905
 Halgerda fibra Fahey & Gosliner, 2000
 Halgerda formosa Bergh, 1880
 Halgerda graphica Basedow & Hedley, 1905 
 Halgerda guahan Carlson & Hoff, 1993
 Halgerda gunnessi Fahey & Gosliner, 2001
 Halgerda indotessellata Tibiriçá, Pola & Cervera, 2018
 Halgerda jennyae Tibiriçá, Pola & Cervera, 2018
 Halgerda johnsonorum Carlson & Hoff, 2000 
 Halgerda leopardalis Tibiriçá, Pola & Cervera, 2018
 Halgerda malesso Carlson & Hoff, 1993
 Halgerda maricola Fahey & Gosliner, 2001 
 Halgerda meringuecitrea Tibiriçá, Pola & Cervera, 2018
 Halgerda mozambiquensis Tibiriçá, Pola & Cervera, 2018
 Halgerda nuarrensis Tibiriçá, Pola & Cervera, 2018
 Halgerda okinawa Carlson & Hoff, 2000
 Halgerda onna Fahey & Gosliner, 2001
 Halgerda orstomi Fahey & Gosliner, 2000
 Halgerda paliensis (Bertsch & Johnson, 1982)
 Halgerda punctata Farran, 1902
 Halgerda rubicunda Baba, 1949 
 Halgerda stricklandi Fahey & Gosliner, 1999
 Halgerda terramtuentis Bertsch & Johnson, 1982
 Halgerda tessellata (Bergh, 1880) - originally as Dictyodoris tessellata Bergh, 1880
 Halgerda theobroma Fahey & Gosliner, 2001
 Halgerda toliara Fahey & Gosliner, 1999
 Halgerda wasinensis Eliot, 1904
 Halgerda willeyi Eliot, 1904
 Halgerda xishaensis Lin, 1975

References

Discodorididae